Britsch is a surname. Notable people with the surname include:

Dominik Britsch (born 1987), German professional boxer
Gustaf Britsch (1879–1923), German art theorist 
R. Lanier Britsch (born 1938), American historian
Todd Britsch (born 1937), American Mormon missionary and Humanities professor